Stackhousia dielsii, commonly known as yellow stackhousia, is a species of plant in the family Celastraceae.

It blooms between July and November and produces yellow-green flowers.

The species is found on sandy soils in coastal areas of the Mid West region of Western Australia.

References

dielsii
Plants described in 1905